Jack McCallister may refer to:

Jack McCallister (Jack & Bobby)
Jack McCallister (baseball) (1879–1946), manager of the Cleveland Indians
 Jack McCallister, a character from the 2005 film Fun with Dick and Jane, played by Alec Baldwin